The Looking Glass River in the U.S. state of Michigan is a river flowing through the central region of the Lower Peninsula.

Name 
Nineteenth-century sources have transcribed the alternate name of Wabenasebee for the river.  That name may refer to the large Chippewa settlement of Wabwahnahseepee that had existed, just north of modern De Witt, when European settlers first arrived.

Course 
It rises in Conway Township in northeast Livingston County and flows north into Shiawassee County, passing between Morrice and Bancroft as it turns westward and passes just south of Laingsburg on the western edge of Shiawassee. It then runs through the southern portion of Clinton County, including DeWitt. It flows into the Grand River in Portland in southeast Ionia County.

The stream starts as a slow soft-bottom waterway. There is more activity in the lower stretch below DeWitt, where there is good fishing and canoeing.

Settlement history 
The earliest known settlers of the Looking Glass Watershed were the Sauk people who were eventually replaced by people of the Chippewa and Ottawa tribes.  The area was highly regarded for its abundance of game and fish.  White settlers came to the area following trails up the Flint and Shiawassee rivers inland from Detroit and Port Huron.

Conservation 
In Clinton County, the river flows through the A Looking Glass Sanctuary, a  nature preserve owned by the Michigan Nature Association.

Fish

References

Rivers of Michigan
Rivers of Livingston County, Michigan
Rivers of Shiawassee County, Michigan
Rivers of Clinton County, Michigan
Rivers of Ionia County, Michigan
Tributaries of Lake Michigan